Love Brewed in the African Pot is a 1980 Ghanaian romantic drama film directed by Kwaw Ansah. It was reportedly the first privately financed Ghanaian feature film and is considered a classic.

Plot
The film takes place in Ghana during the colonial period. Aba Appiah, a woman born to a family of privileged settlers, falls in love with Joe Quansah, a fitting mechanic and son of a simple fisherman. Aba's father, Kofi Appiah, a retired civil servant, is opposed to their marriage, which goes against his plans for his daughter, to whom he had already chosen a husband. This family conflict leads to complex and unforeseen consequences.

Cast

Anima Misa as Aba Appiah
Reginald Tsiboe as Joe Quansah
Emmanuel Agebenowu as Atta Quansah
George Browne as Counsellor Benson
Emmanuel Dadson as Kolo Appiah
Jumoke Debayo as Araba Mansah

Reception

The movie received positive reviews.

References

External links
 

Pidgin English-language films
Films shot in Africa
Films set in Africa
Films set in Ghana
Ghanaian drama films
English-language Ghanaian films
Films about race and ethnicity
1980 comedy-drama films
1980 comedy films
1980 drama films
1980 films
1980s English-language films